Mantidactylus madecassus, commonly known as the Andringitra Madagascar frog, is a species of frog in the family Mantellidae.
It is endemic to Madagascar.

Range and habitat
Mantidactylus madecassus is native to the Andringitra Massif in Madagascar's Central Highlands. It lives in clear, rocky streams between 1,500 and 2,500 meters elevation, in upper montane forest and in high-elevation shrublands and savannas above the tree-line. It is mostly aquatic, and breeds in slower-flowing streams and pools.

It has been recorded at about ten locations in Andringitra. Its extent of occurrence (EOO) is 1,290 km2. It is rare, and its population is decreasing from loss and degradation of habitat.

References

madecassus
Endemic frogs of Madagascar
Taxa named by Jean Marius René Guibé
Taxonomy articles created by Polbot
Amphibians described in 1950
Fauna of the Madagascar subhumid forests
Madagascar ericoid thickets